Simon Parsons (born 3 May 1969) is a British sprint canoer, who competed in the early 1990s. At the 1992 Summer Olympics in Barcelona, he was eliminated in the repechages of the K-1 500 m event.

References
Sports-Reference.com profile

1969 births
Canoeists at the 1992 Summer Olympics
Living people
Olympic canoeists of Great Britain
British male canoeists